The List of Atlantic hurricanes in the 17th century encompasses all known and suspected Atlantic tropical cyclones from 1590s to 1690s. Although records of every storm that occurred do not survive, the information presented here originated in sufficiently populated coastal communities and ships at sea that survived the tempests.

Records of hurricane activity directly impacting America is very incomplete during the 1600s as colonists were sparse outside of the New England region or not existent until much later in the century or early 1700s, especially in the most hurricane prone regions of the coastal south, Florida and the Keys, and Gulf Coast.

1600–1624

1625–1649

1650–1674

1675–1699
 – only paleotempestological evidence

See also

List of Atlantic hurricanes
Atlantic hurricane season

References

Further reading

External links
http://www.nhc.noaa.gov/pastdeadlyapp1.shtml
http://www.candoo.com/genresources/hurricane.htm#1600
http://www.wpc.ncep.noaa.gov/research/roth/vahur.htm
http://www.ucm.es/info/tropical/data.htm
http://huracanado1.tripod.com/history.html

17th century